Jalil Ramli or Abdul Jalil Ramli (born 23 January 1965 in Sarawak) is a former captain Sarawak FA player and coach.

Abdul Jalil is the long throw-in specialist in Malaysia football.

Honours

As a Player
Sarawak FA
Premier League: 1997
Malaysia FA Cup: 1992

As a Manager
Sarawak FA
Malaysia Cup runner-up: 1999
Malaysia FA Cup runner-up: 2001

References

Living people
Malaysian footballers
1965 births
People from Sarawak
Sarawak FA players
Association football midfielders